Árni Njálsson (born 16 June 1936) is an Icelandic former footballer who played as a defender. He won 23 caps for the Iceland national football team between 1956 and 1967.

References

1936 births
Living people
Arni Njalsson
Association football forwards
Arni Njalsson
Arni Njalsson
Arni Njalsson